Josef Paul Hodin (Prague, 1905 - London, 1995) was a Czechoslovak art historian who in 1954 won the first international prize for art criticism at the Venice Biennale for his work on Surrealism and Francis Bacon. Hodin obtained his Doctorate at Charles University in Prague and moved to London during World War II to work as a press attaché to the Norwegian government-in-exile. His work was characterised by strong psychological analysis of the artist's character and an interest in geistesgeschichte and the zeitgeist. Hodin was a specialist in modern art and this is reflected in his published works. His papers are in the archive of the Tate Gallery.

Honours
Order of St. Olav, Norway, 1958. (for Munch studies)
Commander of the Order of Merit, Italy, 1966.
Grand Cross, Order of Merit, Austria, 1968.

Selected publications
Edvard Munch: Nordens genius. Stockholm: Ljus, 1948. (English: Edvard Munch. London: Thames and Hudson, 1972. )
The Dilemma of Being Modern: Essays on Art and Literature. London: 1956.
Ben Nicholson: the Meaning of his Art. London: A. Tiranti, 1957.
Barbara Hepworth. London: Lund Humphries, 1961.
Oskar Kokoschka: The Artist and His Time: A Biographical Study. Greenwich, CT: New York Graphic Society, 1966.
Modern Art and the Modern Mind. Cleveland: Case Western Reserve University, 1972.

References

1905 births
1995 deaths
Writers from Prague
Czech emigrants to the United Kingdom
Czech art historians
Charles University alumni
Recipients of the Order of Merit of the Italian Republic
Czechoslovak historians
Czechoslovak emigrants to the United Kingdom